Michaela Malá (born 12 January 2003) is a Czech handballer for DHC Slavia Prague and the Czech national team.

She participated at the 2021 World Women's Handball Championship in Spain, placing 19th.

References

External links

2003 births
Living people
Sportspeople from Plzeň
Czech female handball players